Wildlife contraceptives are contraceptives used to regulate the fertility of wild animals. They are used to control population growth of certain wild animals.

Usage 
White-tailed deer may be controlled with contraceptives in suburban areas, where they are sometimes a nuisance. In parts of the United States, does are shot with darts containing a contraceptive vaccine, rendering them temporarily infertile. The Humane Society of the United States runs a deer birth control program, but it is experimental; it may not be cost-effective in the long run. It may cost $300 to $1000 per deer.

One contraceptive vaccine used is porcine zona pellucida (PZP), or derivatives. This form of immunocontraception prevents sperm from accessing an ovum. Another form of deer contraception, called GonaCon, produces antibodies to sex drive hormones in the deer, causing them to lose interest in mating.

Similar forms of injectable contraceptive are being studied for use in elk and gray squirrels.

Oral contraceptives may also be developed for population control among a variety of animals, including deer, feral pigs, coyotes, cougars, dogs and cats.  One product that has success in mice, rats, and dogs originally went by the name Mouseopause, but was approved for commercial use under the name ContraPest. Another project is five-year development and trial of several oral contraceptives for gray squirrels in the UK. The project has been supported by the UK's Department for Environment, Food and Rural Affairs and aims to "provide an effective, less labour intensive, non-lethal method for managing grey squirrels" by January 2024.

Pigeons have been a target for experimental contraceptives for decades. An oral contraceptive is in use for the control of Canada geese.

A slow-release hormonal contraceptive implant for female Tasmanian devils is under development.  While it may seem counter-intuitive to develop contraceptives for an endangered animal, their use is intended to promote the wild behaviour of mating freely, but without certain females over-contributing to the next generation, which "can have long-term genetic consequences for the insurance population". Contraceptive trials in male devils showed that their testosterone increased, instead of decreasing as other male mammals' testosterone does.

See also
Neutering
Xenoestrogen

References

Further reading

External links 
 Botstiber Institute for Wildlife Fertility Control

Animal welfare
Birth control
Theriogenology